Headlight Herald may refer to one of these U.S. newspapers:

Headlight Herald (Tracy), a newspaper published in Tracy, Minnesota
Headlight-Herald (Tillamook), a newspaper published in Tillamook, Oregon